During the 1998–99 English football season, Aston Villa competed in the Premier League (known as the FA Carling Premiership for sponsorship reasons). The season was Villa's eighth in the Premier League, and their eleventh consecutive season in the top division of English football.

This would be manager John Gregory's first full season. The early-season sale of Dwight Yorke to Manchester United seemed to rule out Villa's chances of challenging for a place in Europe, but new signings Dion Dublin and Paul Merson soon revitalised the attack and the team spent much of the first half of the season at the top of the Premiership.

Eventually, the challenge from Manchester United, Arsenal and Chelsea proved to be too strong, and Villa's season capitulated. The team finally finished sixth below fellow blue-claret team West Ham United and thus missing out on a European place.

Final league table 

Results summary

Results by matchday

Results 
Aston Villa's results

Players

First-team squad 
Squad at end of season

Left club during season

Reserve squad 
The following players did not appear for the first-team this season.

Youth team 
The following players spent most of the season playing for the U-17 and U-19 teams, but may have also appeared for the reserves.

Other players 
The following players did not play for any Villa team this season.

Transfers

In

Out 

Transfers in:  £30,425,000
Transfers out:  £21,200,000
Total spending:  £9,225,000

Statistics

Appearances and goals 

|-
! colspan=14 style=background:#dcdcdc; text-align:center| Goalkeepers

|-
! colspan=14 style=background:#dcdcdc; text-align:center| Defenders

|-
! colspan=14 style=background:#dcdcdc; text-align:center| Midfielders

|-
! colspan=14 style=background:#dcdcdc; text-align:center| Forwards

|-
! colspan=14 style=background:#dcdcdc; text-align:center| Players transferred out during the season

Starting 11 
Considering starts in all competitions

Goalscorers

Notes

References

External links
Aston Villa official website
avfchistory.co.uk 1998–99 season

Aston Villa F.C. seasons
Aston Villa